PGA National Resort is a resort in Palm Beach Gardens, Florida. It has five championship 18-hole golf courses, the most famous of which is "The Champion", which has hosted the 1983 Ryder Cup, the 1987 PGA Championship, the Senior PGA Championship for 19 consecutive years from 1982 to 2000, and the PGA Tour's Honda Classic since 2007.

It has been home to the Professional Golfers' Association of America since the resort's establishment, but the PGA has announced that it will move to new headquarters in Texas in summer 2022.

The resort also includes 339 hotel rooms, nine restaurants and lounges, a 34,000-square-foot conference wing, a 40,000-square-foot spa, 33,000-square-foot health and racquet club with 19 tennis courts, a golf academy, and a members club. It was sold by the developer, E. Llwyd Ecclestone Jr., to Walton Street Capital in 2006 for $170 million, before being sold again in 2018, to Brookfield Asset Management for $218m.

Courses
 The Champion - The Champion course opened in 1981 on November 17. It was the site of the Ryder Cup in 1983, the PGA Championship in 1987 (won by Larry Nelson), and the Senior PGA Championship for 19 years, from 1982–2000. The course underwent a $4 million renovation in December 2002 and became the home of The Honda Classic on the PGA Tour in 2007.  The tough three hole stretch of the par-3 15th, par-4 16th, and par-3 17th holes is known as "The Bear Trap," named after Jack Nicklaus, who is nicknamed the Golden Bear and redesigned the course. The course was host to the 2018 Governor Cup for the first time in its history.
 The Fazio - Originally the Haig Course, named for golfing great Walter Hagen.  It was the first course opened for play at PGA National Resort, on March 4, 1980, then was renovated and renamed The Fazio upon opening in November, 2012.
 The Palmer - The Palmer, named for golf legend and course designer Arnold Palmer, was the last of the original four courses built at PGA National, opening on February 28, 1984. The Palmer was previously named “The General”.
 The Estates - The Estates originally opened in November 1984 as Stonewall Golf Club, and has been part of PGA National since August 28, 1988.
 The Match - Borne from the old Squire Course, the Match Course opened for play in the fall of 2021 and was designed with match play in mind.  It delivers a unique golf experience sure to appeal to purists, players and beginners alike.
 The Staple - With holes ranging from 60–130 yards, this 9-hole course is perfect for experimenting with a variety of shots and is fun for players of all abilities.

Earlier clubs

BallenIsles
The original PGA National Golf Club (1964–1973) in Palm Beach Gardens was nearby to the east, and is now the BallenIsles Country Club. The Champions Course (now the East Course at BallenIsles) hosted the PGA Championship in 1971, won by Nicklaus in late February. It also was the site of eight consecutive Senior PGA Championships (1966–1973), and the original qualifying school tournaments for the PGA Tour.

Dunedin
An earlier PGA National Golf Club (1944–1962) was on the western side of the state at Dunedin, northwest of Tampa. Designed by noted architect Donald Ross  it opened  in 1927 as a municipal course. The PGA of America moved its national offices from Chicago to Dunedin in 1956, then sold its holdings in the course back to the city in 1962 and relocated to eastern Florida in 1965 at Palm Beach Gardens. Now the Dunedin Golf Club, the course was added to the National Register of Historic Places in 2014.

Scorecard

References

Golf clubs and courses in Florida
Sports venues in Palm Beach County, Florida
Ryder Cup venues
Palm Beach Gardens, Florida
1980 establishments in Florida